"Burn for You" is a song by Australian pop rock singer John Farnham. It was released in November 1990 as the third single from his 14th studio album, Chain Reaction. The song peaked at number five on the Australian Singles Chart. At the ARIA Music Awards of 1991, it won the Song of the Year. B-side "Chains Around the Heart" was later recorded by Richard Marx under the title "Chains Around My Heart".

Track listings
Australian CD and 7-inch single
 "Burn for You"  - 3:45
 "Chains Around the Heart"  - 6:36

12-inch single
 "Burn for You"  - 3:45
 "The Time Has Come"  - 4:55
 "Chains Around the Heart"  - 6:36

Charts

Weekly charts

Year-end charts

References

1990 singles
1990 songs
John Farnham songs
RCA Records singles
Songs written by Phil Buckle